Henry Brown may refer to:

Politics and government
 Henry Billings Brown (1836–1913), U.S. Supreme Court Justice, 1891–1906
 Henry E. Brown Jr. (born 1935), U.S. Congressman from South Carolina, 2000–2011
 Henry Brown (Australian politician) (1865–1933), Australian politician
 Henry Brown (New Zealand politician) (1842–1921), New Zealand politician
 Henry Newton Brown Jr. (born 1941), Louisiana judge and former District Attorney

Sports
 Henry Brown (field hockey) (1887–1961), Irish Olympic field hockey player
 Henry Brown (rugby union) (1910–1965), New Zealand rugby union player, member of the All Blacks
 Henry Brandon Brown (born 1994), South African rugby union player

Other
 Henry Armitt Brown (1844–1878), American author and orator
 Henry Box Brown (1815–1897), American slave who had himself mailed in a box to freedom
 Henry Kirke Brown (1814–1886), American sculptor
 Henry Newton Brown (1857–1884), American lawman and Old West outlaw
 Henry "Pucho" Brown, leader of Pucho & His Latin Soul Brothers
 Henry Yorke Lyell Brown (1843–1928), Australian geologist
 Henry B. R. Brown (1926–2008), American co-creator of the money market fund
 Henry Brown (inventor), inventor of the strongbox
 Henry Phelps Brown (1906–1994), British economist
 Henry T. Brown (1932–2020), African-American chemical engineer
 Henry William Brown (1923–2008), American fighter pilot
 Henry Brown (American clergyman) (1848–1931), Methodist missionary and  prohibitionist
 Henry Brown, designer of the Rodley and Scootacar microcars in the 1950s
 Henry Collins Brown (1862–1961), Scottish-born New York historian, lecturer, and author
 Henry L. Brown (1876–1960), African-American physician in Laurel, Mississippi
 Henry Brown (actor), African American actor whose career started in the early 1970s
 Reverend Henry Brown, African Methodist Episcopal Church minister and leader of the Underground Railroad

See also
 Henry Browne (disambiguation)
 Harry Brown (disambiguation)